Rugby union in New South Wales is one of the leading professional and recreational team sports. Rugby football began to be played in Sydney’s schools in the early 1860s. In the more than 150 years since, the game in New South Wales has grown to include more than 100,000 participants and the Rugby World Cup Final has been hosted in Sydney.

History
Reports of folk football being played in the Colony of New South Wales date from at least as early as 1829. Games were occasional and included matches played by soldiers at Sydney's barracks or against the crews of visiting ships. The rules were variable and negotiated by the players before each game.

Rugby beginnings
Football played under versions of the Rugby School rules was brought to Australia by Old Boys of the English public schools. Some settlers would have been familiar with earlier forms of the game even before it was formally codified at Rugby School in 1845. The Rugby code was introduced to schools in Sydney from the early 1860s. Players familiar with the game from the Sydney schools, along with increased arrivals from England and elsewhere, soon led to organised club football commencing in Sydney. Rugby games were being played at Sydney University in the 1860s.

The first ‘inter-club’ rugby match took place during July 1865 between the Sydney Football Club and a team from the Australian Cricket Club. The game was intended to be played over three Saturdays but the newspapers of the time only report on the first two. The game was postponed after the second Saturday when the Sydney FC held a lead of two goals to one, but no record has been found of the final result. Newington College is credited with having a rugby club as early as 1869. From 1872 onwards there was a rapid growth in the formation of rugby football clubs.

At a meeting of Sydney clubs on 22 June 1874, the Southern Rugby Football Union was formed as the governing body for rugby in New South Wales, and it was later renamed the New South Wales Rugby Union in 1892.

New South Wales state team

The New South Wales Waratahs team is the representative team of the NSWRU. The Waratahs have competed in the transnational Super Rugby competition since the start of the professional era of rugby in 1996.

Competitions

Super Rugby

The New South Wales Waratahs play in the Super Rugby competition against other professional teams from Australia, South Africa, New Zealand and Argentina. The Waratahs team won the Super Rugby title for the first time in 2014, after having previously reached the final in 2005 and 2008.

National Rugby Championship
 
New South Wales has two teams in the National Rugby Championship:
 New South Wales Country
 Sydney

Shute Shield

Premiership Rugby is contested in Sydney across four senior grades and three colts competitions. Club Championship trophies are also contested on overall results. The Shute Shield is the trophy for the first grade premiership competition, and the eleven clubs currently competing for the premiership are:

 Eastern Suburbs
 Eastwood
 Gordon 
 Manly

 Northern Suburbs
 Parramatta
 Randwick
 Southern Districts

 Sydney University
 Warringah
 West Harbour

Over the many years of competition for the NSW premiership, a number of formerly notable clubs became defunct. Some of the early ones include: Glebe (Australian Club Champions in 1908),  Pirates,  The Sydney Football Club (est. 1865), and Wallaroos. 

The Tooheys New Cup, which was the other recent first grade competition, ran from 2002 to 2006. An abbreviated Shute Shield competition was played in the latter part of the season during those years. When the Tooheys New Cup competition was disbanded, the Shute Shield competition was expanded again for the 2007 season.

Suburban rugby
Below the NSWRU grade competition is the New South Wales Suburban Rugby Union (commonly known as Subbies). With over 6,000 players and 55 clubs this is believed to be the largest centrally organised rugby union competition in the world.

Country Rugby

The New South Wales Country Rugby Union is affiliated with the NSWRU and administers game in the majority of non-metropolitan areas of NSW. The union is split into nine zones with 100 clubs and over 16,000 players. NSW Country is represented by the New South Wales Country Cockatoos team.

Women's Rugby
Club competitions for women's 15-a-side teams are run in Sydney and Newcastle. A representative team from Sydney is regularly selected to play the NSW Country Corellas and the Australian Army women's team. The NSWRU also sends women's 15-a-side and 7-a-side representative teams to the ARU National Championships each year. The six clubs in the Sydney women's competition, as of 2014, are:

Parramatta Two Blues
Penrith Emus
Rockdale Rangers

Sydney University
Warringah Rugby Club
Waverley Rugby Club

Schoolboy Rugby

The Waratah Shield is a rugby union knock-out competition for high school teams from New South Wales, Australia. First contested in 1963, it is organised by New South Wales Rugby Union in conjunction with NSW Schools' Rugby Union and NSW Combined High Schools and attracts around 100 entries each year.

Taki Toa Shield

The Taki Toa Shield is a rugby union tournament played among semi-professional clubs and an invitational New Zealand Māori community team in Sydney which started in 1983.

References

Bibliography

External links 
nswrugby.com.au
waratahs.com.au

 
Sport in New South Wales by sport